Soteriscus is a genus of woodlice in the family Porcellionidae found in Macaronesian islands and adjacent parts of Europe and Africa. It contains the following species:
Soteriscus bremondi Vandel, 1960 – Madeira
Soteriscus brumdocantoi Vandel, 1960 – Madeira: Porto Santo Island
Soteriscus desertarum Vandel, 1960 – Madeira: Desertas Islands
Soteriscus disimilis Rodríguez, 1990 – Canary Islands: Lanzarote, Lobos Island and Fuerteventura
Soteriscus fructuosi Vandel, 1960 – Madeira: Porto Santo Island
Soteriscus fuscovariegatus (Lucas, 1849) – northern Algeria
Soteriscus gaditanus Vandel, 1956 – southern Spain: Tarifa; northwestern Morocco
Soteriscus madeirae Arcangeli, 1958 – Madeira
Soteriscus mateui Vandel, 1957 – Cape Verde
Soteriscus porcellioniformis Vandel, 1960 – Madeira: Porto Santo Island
Soteriscus relictus Vandel, 1960 – Madeira: Islote de Desembarcadouro
Soteriscus stricticauda (Dollfus, 1893) – western Canary Islands
Soteriscus trilineatus Rodríguez & Vicente, 1992 – Canary Islands: La Gomera
Soteriscus virescens (Budde-Lund, 1885) – northwestern Morocco
Soteriscus wollastoni (Paulian de Félice, 1939) – Madeira

References

Porcellionidae